The Battle of Ihtiman occurred in 1355 between Bulgarians and Ottomans and resulted in an Ottoman victory. The exact location is not known, but in an anonymous Bulgarian chronicle, it is mentioned that the armies of Michail Asen engaged the invading forces before they could reach Sofia.

Background 
After the Ottoman Turks seized their first fortress in the Balkans in 1352, they quickly began to expand their territory in Europe. From the year 1354, their raiding parties began looting in Bulgarian Thrace, ravaging the regions of Plovdiv and Stara Zagora, and in the following year launched a campaign against the key city of Sofia.

Battle 
The son of the Bulgarian Emperor Ivan Alexander, Michail Asen, summoned an army to stop the advancing enemy. The battle was fierce, the Bulgarians suffered heavy casualties and their commander and heir to the throne was killed. However, the Ottoman losses were also heavy and they were unable to continue their march on Sofia.

Aftermath 
The battle showed that the Bulgarians were not ready to challenge the Turks in an open field battle and the loss of their eldest and allegedly most capable son was a great blow for the Bulgarians and their Emperor. But the battle and his death were not in vain: the Ottomans were able to reach Sofia 30 years later in 1382. But during that time, the Bulgarians could not prevent them from taking over the whole Thrace.

Citations

References 

Battles involving the Second Bulgarian Empire
Battles involving the Ottoman Empire
1355 in Europe
Conflicts in 1355
14th century in Bulgaria
1355 in the Ottoman Empire
Ihtiman